Kunstprodukt is the debut album from the German electronic music band Miss Construction.

Content
The album starts with a compact intro that comes along with noisy sound structures, and beats, the ‘Miss Construction Theme’ which follows directly after the intro. There are also songs with lyrics like Kunstprodukt dealing with the phenomenon of the super pop stars who get famous despite the fact that they seemingly lack artistic talent or singing skills.

Tracks
 "Intro" (2:29)
 "Miss Construction Theme" (4:48)
 "Kunstprodukt" (3:58)
 "Eins und Zwei" (4:33)
 "Headshot" (5:00)
 "F**k Me, too" (4:26)
 "Hass und Liebe" (ECO Cover) (5:11)
 "Lunatic" (4:05)
 "I Luv U" (4:59)
 "Totes Fleisch" (Terminal Choice Cover) (4:36)
 "Slaughterhouse" (4:59)
 "F**k U bitch" (4:48)
 "Pornostar" (4:24)
 "Electro Beast" (5:02)
 "Kunstprodukt" - (Gintronic Remix) (3:41)
 "Electro Beast" - (Dolls of Pain Remix) (4:41)

Information
 All tracks written and produced by Christian "Chris" Pohl
 Male vocals by * by Gordon Mocznay

Songs included in compilations
 2008: Miss Construction Theme on God Sent Us to Destroy (Live in Birmingham)
 2008: F**k Me Too on Awake the Machines Vol. 6 Sampler
 2008: Kunstprodukt on Extreme Sündenfall 7 Sampler
 2008: Pornostar on Zillo New Signs & Sounds 04/08
 2008: Miss Construction Theme on Cyber Angels & The Devil (Live in Tilburg)

References

External links
Discogs Profile

2008 debut albums